The Windrose 20 is an American trailerable sailboat that was designed by Ron Holder as a cruiser and first built in 1977.

Production
The design was built by Laguna Yachts in the United States, starting in 1977, but it is now out of production.

Design
The Windrose 20 is a recreational keelboat, built predominantly of fiberglass, with wood trim. It has a fractional sloop rig, a raked stem, a plumb transom, a transom-hung rudder controlled by a tiller and a fixed stub keel and retractable centerboard. It displaces .

The boat is normally fitted with a small outboard motor for docking and maneuvering.

The design has sleeping accommodation for four people, with a double "V"-berth in the bow cabin and two straight settee berths in the main cabin. The galley is located on the starboard side amidships. The head is located in the bow cabin on the port side under the "V"-berth.

For sailing the design may be equipped with one of several sized of jibs or genoas.

See also
List of sailing boat types

References

External links
Photo of a Windrose 20

Keelboats
1970s sailboat type designs
Sailing yachts 
Trailer sailers
Sailboat type designs by Ron Holder
Sailboat types built by Laguna Yachts